The Merlin class was a class of twenty-one sloops of wooden construction built for the Royal Navy between 1743 and 1746. They were all built by contract with commercial builders to a common design prepared by Jacob Acworth, the Surveyor of the Navy; however, there was a difference, with a platform deck being constructed in the hold in Swallow (i), Merlin, Raven and Swallow (ii), whereas the other seventeen had no platform and thus their depth in hold was nearly twice as much.

Although initially armed with ten 6-pounder guns, this class was built with seven pairs of gunports on the upper deck, enabling them to be re-armed with fourteen 6-pounders later in their careers.

The first two – Swallow and Merlin – were ordered on 7 July 1743 to be built to replace two ex-Spanish vessels (the Galgo and Peregrine's Prize, both captured in 1742, and put into service by the British). Two more vessels to the same design were ordered on 30 March 1744; another two were ordered five days later, four more followed on 23 May and three others were ordered later that year.

On 5 April 1745 five more were ordered – including a second Falcon (named to replace the first, captured in the same year) and a second Swallow (similarly to replace the first, wrecked in 1744) – and a single extra vessel was ordered on 11 April. A final pair were ordered on 9 January 1746.

Vessels

References 

McLaughlan, Ian. The Sloop of War 1650–1763. Seaforth Publishing, 2014. .
Winfield, Rif. British Warships in the Age of Sail 1714–1792: Design, Construction, Careers and Fates. Seaforth Publishing, 2007. .

Sloop classes